Ville Koskimaa (born 21 May 1983) is a Finnish professional footballer who currently plays for the Ykkönen side VPS.

References

External links
Guardian Football 

1983 births
Living people
Finnish footballers
FC Honka players
Veikkausliiga players
Kokkolan Palloveikot players
Pallohonka players
FC Kiisto players
Association football central defenders
Sportspeople from Vaasa